Claude (Marie-Émile) Boismard (December 14, 1916 – April 23, 2004) was a French biblical scholar.

He was educated in Rome, he was professor of the New Testament. As part of the École Biblique, he was one of the translators who created the Jerusalem Bible. He was a member of Dominican Order, and was one of the most important French biblical scholars.

He created a new hypothesis concerned to the Synoptic problem, the question of Acts, the two texts of the Book of Revelation, and about origin of the Codex Bezae.

Works
"L'Apocalypse", ou "les Apocalypses" de S. Jean, Revue Biblique, volume 56, No. 4 (October 1949), pp. 507-541 
 L'Apocalypse (La Sainte Bible traduite en français sous la direction de l'École biblique de Jérusalem), Paris, Éd. du Cerf, 1950.
 Le Prologue de saint Jean, Paris, Éd. du Cerf, «Lectio Divina» 11, 1953.
 Du Baptême à Cana (Jean 1,19-2,11), Paris, Éd. du Cerf, «Lectio Divina» 18, 1956.
 Quatre hymnes baptismales dans la première épître de Pierre, Paris, Éd. du Cerf, «Lectio Divina» 30, 1961.
 Synopse des quatre évangiles en français avec parallèles des apocryphes et des Pères, vol. I, Textes, avec P. Benoit, Paris, Éd. du Cerf, 1965.
 Synopse des quatre évangiles en français, vol. II, Commentaire, avec P. Benoit, A. Lamouille et P. Sandevoir, Paris, Éd. du Cerf, 1972.
 Synopse des quatre évangiles en français, vol. III, L'évangile de Jean, avec A. Lamouille et G. Rochais, Paris, Éd. du Cerf, 1977.
 La Vie des Évangiles. Initiation à la critique des textes, avec A. Lamouille, Paris, Éd. du Cerf, 1980.
 Le Texte occidental des Actes des apôtres. Reconstitution et réhabilitation, (2 vol.) (Synthèse 17), avec A. Lamouille, Paris, Éd. Recherche sur les civilisations, 1984. Édition nouvelle entièrement refondue (Études bibliques NS 40), Paris, J. Gabalda, 2000.
 Synopsis Graeca Quattuor Evangeliorum, avec A. Lamouille, Leuven-Paris, Peeters, 1986.
 Moïse ou Jésus. Essai de christologie johannique (BETL, 86), Leuven, University Press-Peeters, 1988.
 Les Actes des deux apôtres (3 vol.) avec A. Lamouille (Études bibliques 12-14), Paris, J. Gabalda, 1989.
 Un évangile pré-johannique (F. vol. I [Jean 1,1-2,12] en 2 tomes, avec Arnaud Lamouille, Paris, Gabalda [Études Bibliques, n.s. 17-18], 1993; vol. II [Jean 2,13-4,54] en 2 tomes, Paris, Gabalda [Études Bibliques n.s. 24-25], 1994; vol. III).
 L'évangile de Marc. Sa préhistoire (F. Paris, Gabalda [Études Bibliques n.s. 26], 1994).
 Faut-il encore parler de « résurrection »? (F. Paris, Cerf, 1995)
 Jésus, un homme de Nazareth, raconté par Marc l'évangéliste, Éd. du Cerf, 1996.
 Le martyre de Jean l'apôtre (CRB 35), Paris, Gabalda, 1996.
 L'Évangile de l'enfance (Luc 1 - 2) selon le proto-Luc (Études bibliques 35), Paris, J. Gabalda, 1997.
 En quête du proto-Luc (Études bibliques 37), Paris, J. Gabalda, 1997.
 À l'aube du christianisme. Avant la naissance des dogmes (Théologie), Paris, Cerf, 1998.
 Critique textuelle ou critique littéraire? Jean 7,1-51 (CRB 40), Paris, J. Gabalda, 1998.
 La lettre de saint Paul aux Laodicéens retrouvée et commentée (CRB 42), Paris, Gabalda, 1999.
 L'énigme de la lettre aux Éphésiens (Études bibliques NS 39), Paris, J. Gabalda, 1999.
 Le baptême selon le Nouveau Testament (Théologies), Paris, Le Cerf, 2001.
 Comment Luc a remanié l'évangile de Jean (CRB 51), Paris, J. Gabalda, 2001.
 L'évangile selon Matthieu, d'après un papyrus de la collection Schøyen. Analyses littéraires (CRB 55), Paris, Gabalda, 2003.

See also
 List of Christian theologians

External links
  Quelques notes de lecture des travaux de Marie-Emile Boismard
  Le site de l'Ecole Biblique et Archéologique Française de Jérusalem où Marie-Emile Boismard a enseigné

1916 births
2004 deaths
French Dominicans
French biblical scholars
Roman Catholic biblical scholars
New Testament scholars
Academic staff of École Biblique